Premier League Matchday (formerly Soccer Central and Soccer Central Matchday) is a soccer news show, made by Rogers Media, shown on Sportsnet most Saturdays before and after Premier League matches. The show features Canadians Gerry Dobson and Craig Forrest. Before August 2012, the show was known as Soccer Central, but was renamed because of the introduction of the show Soccer Central. The name was changed again before the 2013-14 Premier League season.

Focus
Before Premier League matches, Dobson and Forrest preview the upcoming matches. After words, they review the past matches and speak about Canadian and World football.

Soccer on Canadian television
Sportsnet shows
Premier League on television
2010s Canadian sports television series